Aldana Huilen Carraro (12 September 1994 - 10 July 2015) was an Argentine female artistic gymnast and part of the national team.  She participated at the 2010 World Artistic Gymnastics Championships in Rotterdam, the Netherlands.

References

External links
Profile at FIG

1994 births
2015 deaths
Argentine female artistic gymnasts
Place of birth missing